Daniel P. Silva (born December 3, 1943) was an American politician who was a Democratic member of the New Mexico House of Representatives from 1984 to 2008. He holds a bachelor of science degree from the University of Albuquerque.

References

External links

1943 births
Living people
Democratic Party members of the New Mexico House of Representatives
University of Albuquerque alumni